What Did We Do Wrong? is a comedy play about a businessman who turns hippie. The original Broadway production starred Paul Ford and cost $75,000. It only had a short run.

The play was profiled in the William Goldman book The Season: A Candid Look at Broadway.

References

External links

1967 plays
Comedy plays